Mokrzec may refer to the following places:
Mokrzec, Grodzisk Wielkopolski County in Greater Poland Voivodeship (west-central Poland)
Mokrzec, Masovian Voivodeship (east-central Poland)
Mokrzec, Subcarpathian Voivodeship (south-east Poland)
Mokrzec, Międzychód County in Greater Poland Voivodeship (west-central Poland)